William de Palmorna DD (also Polmorva; died 1362) was an English medieval churchman, college head, and university chancellor.

William de Palmorna was a Fellow and Rector of Exeter College. In 1340, he was one of twelve Fellows selected for The Queen's College, Oxford by its founder Robert de Eglesfield. Between 1350 and 1351, he was Chancellor of the University of Oxford. He was a Doctor of Divinity. He was a prebendary at the King's Free Chapel in Hastings, within the Diocese of Chichester and also at Windsor. He died in 1362 and left a legacy to Exeter College.

References

Year of birth unknown
1362 deaths
14th-century English Roman Catholic priests
Fellows of Exeter College, Oxford
Fellows of The Queen's College, Oxford
Rectors of Exeter College, Oxford
Chancellors of the University of Oxford
Canons of Windsor